April 21 - Eastern Orthodox liturgical calendar - April 23

All fixed commemorations below are observed on May 5 by Eastern Orthodox Churches on the Old Calendar.

For April 22nd, Orthodox Churches on the Old Calendar commemorate the Saints listed on April 9.

Saints

 Holy Apostle Nathaniel of the Twelve (Bartholomew) (1st century)
 Apostles Apelles, Luke (not the Evangelist), and Clement, of the Seventy (1st century)
 Martyr Leonides of Alexandria, Bishop (202)
 Martyr Nearchus, by fire (3rd century)
 Venerable Theodore the Sykeote, Bishop of Anastasiopolis in Galatia (613) (see also: June 15 - Translation; June 16 - Uncovering)
 Saint Vitalis of Gaza, monk of the monastery of Abba Seridus at Gaza (609-620) (see also: January 11)

Pre-Schism Western saints

 Hieromartyr Soter, Pope of Rome (c. 174)
 Martyrs Epipodius of Lyons, by beheading (c. 177)
 Saint Gaius, born in Dalmatia, became Pope of Rome, martyred with members of his family (296)  (see also: August 11)
 Saint Agapitus I, Pope of Rome (536) (see also: April 17 - East)
 Saint Leo of Sens, Bishop of Sens in France for twenty-three years (541)
 The Two Brothers Arwald, sons of Arwald, the last Jutish King of the Isle of Wight, put to death by soldiers of King Ceadwalla, then a pagan, on the day after their baptism (686)
 Saint Opportuna of Montreuil, sister of St Chrodegang, Bishop of Séez, Abbess at the convent of Monteuil (c. 770)
 Saint Senorina, a Galician abbess who served as the abbess of the Benedictine convent of St John of Venaria (Vieyra) (982)

Post-Schism Orthodox saints

 Saint Ananias of Malles, first monk, renovator and Abbot of the Holy Monastery of Panagia Exakousti in the village of Malles in Ierapetra, Crete (1907)
 Saint Ekaterina (Malkov-Panina), fool-for-Christ, of the Holy Dormition Pukhtitsa Convent in Estonia (1968)

New martyrs and confessors

 New Hieromartyr Eustathius Malahovsky, Priest (1918)
 New Hieromartyr Platon of Banja Luka (Platon Jovanovic), Bishop of Banja Luka (1941) (see also: May 5)
 Martyr Demetrius Vlasenkov (1942)

Other commemorations

 Translation of the relics (1834) of St. Vsevolod (in holy baptism Gabriel), Prince and Wonderworker of Pskov (1138)
 Repose of Blessed fool-for-Christ Athanasius Andreyevich Saiko of Orel (1967)

Icon gallery

Notes

References

Sources
 April 22 / May 5. Orthodox Calendar (PRAVOSLAVIE.RU).
 May 5 / April 22. Holy Trinity Russian Orthodox Church (A parish of the Patriarchate of Moscow).
 April 22. OCA - The Lives of the Saints.
 The Autonomous Orthodox Metropolia of Western Europe and the Americas. St. Hilarion Calendar of Saints for the year of our Lord 2004. St. Hilarion Press (Austin, TX). p. 30.
 April 22. Latin Saints of the Orthodox Patriarchate of Rome.
 The Roman Martyrology. Transl. by the Archbishop of Baltimore. Last Edition, According to the Copy Printed at Rome in 1914. Revised Edition, with the Imprimatur of His Eminence Cardinal Gibbons. Baltimore: John Murphy Company, 1916. pp. 113–114.
 Rev. Richard Stanton. A Menology of England and Wales, or, Brief Memorials of the Ancient British and English Saints Arranged According to the Calendar, Together with the Martyrs of the 16th and 17th Centuries. London: Burns & Oates, 1892. pp. 176–177.
Greek Sources
 Great Synaxaristes:  22 Απριλίου. Μεγασ Συναξαριστησ.
  Συναξαριστής. 22 Απριλίου. ecclesia.gr. (H Εκκλησια Τησ Ελλαδοσ). 
Russian Sources
  5 мая (22 апреля). Православная Энциклопедия под редакцией Патриарха Московского и всея Руси Кирилла (электронная версия). (Orthodox Encyclopedia - Pravenc.ru).
  22 апреля (ст.ст.) 5 мая 2013 (нов. ст.) . Русская Православная Церковь Отдел внешних церковных связей.

April in the Eastern Orthodox calendar